Omsk International Management and Foreign Language Institute, known as Omsk Foreign Language Institute until 2009, is a higher education facility in Omsk, Russia, established in 1991.

References

Omsk
Education in Omsk Oblast